Casey Pierro-Zabotel (born November 8, 1988) is a Canadian professional ice hockey centre who is currently an unrestricted free agent. He most recently played for the Adirondack Thunder of the ECHL. He was drafted by the Pittsburgh Penguins in the 2007 NHL Entry Draft, 80th overall, out of the British Columbia Hockey League (BCHL).  Playing major junior with the Vancouver Giants of the Western Hockey League (WHL), he set franchise single-season records in 2008–09 with 79 assists and 115 points, en route to a Bob Clarke Trophy as the league's leading scorer.

Playing career
Undrafted by a WHL team, Pierro-Zabotel began his junior hockey career with the Merritt Centennials of the Junior A British Columbia Hockey League (BCHL) in 2004–05.  He produced at a near point-per-game pace in his second season with the Centennials before dominating the league in 2006–07, his draft year, with 51 goals, 65 assists and 116 points in 55 games.  Going into the 2007 NHL Entry Draft, Pierro-Zabotel was ranked 75th among North American skaters by NHL Central Scouting, up from 87th in their mid-term rankings.  He would be taken in the third round, 80th overall, by the Pittsburgh Penguins.

Set to make the jump from Junior A to college hockey for Michigan Tech in 2007–08, he was deemed ineligible to play for the first semester by the NCAA for academic reasons. As a result, Pierro-Zabotel instead signed with the Memorial Cup defending champions, Vancouver Giants of the WHL, in November 2007.  He scored his first WHL goal on November 24 against the Medicine Hat Tigers and tallied 48 points in 49 games for the Giants in his major junior rookie season.

Beginning the 2008–09 season on the top line with Evander Kane, Pierro-Zabotel was named WHL Player of the Week on October 5 after recording 7 points in 2 games.  Just 44 games into the season, he set a Giants single-season record with his 54th assist as part of a 5-point game on January 17, 2009, in a 9–3 win against the Red Deer Rebels.  The team mark was previously set by Darren Lynch, who recorded 53 assists in 70 games in 2002–03. A little over a week later, on January 25, Pierro-Zabotel tied the Giants' franchise mark for single-season points set by Gilbert Brule in 2004–05 with his 87th point of the season.  He broke the record the next game against the Medicine Hat Tigers, on January 28, with an assist in a 4–3 win.  His record-setting January was capped off with a WHL Player of the Month recognition after tallying 28 points in 15 games.  Pierro-Zabotel completed his second WHL season with a league-high 115 points (36 goals and 79 assists) to become the first Giants recipient of the Bob Clarke Trophy.  He was also named co-team MVP with captain Jonathon Blum and was unanimously selected to the WHL West First All-Star Team.  After eliminating the Spokane Chiefs in the second round of the playoffs, Pierro-Zabotel was named the Western Conference's nominee for the Four Broncos Memorial Trophy as top WHL player.  The award was given to Eastern Conference finalist Brett Sonne of the Calgary Hitmen.  In game two of the semifinals, he scored the game winning overtime goal to defeat the Kelowna Rockets 4–3 and tie the series 1–1.  The Giants were, however, eliminated in six games.  Pierro-Zabotel completed the post-season with 17 points in 17 games.

A week after Pierro-Zabotel's final WHL season ended, the Penguins signed him to a three-year, entry level contract on May 4, 2009.  He was subsequently assigned to the American Hockey League (AHL) to join the Pittsburgh's minor league affiliate, the Wilkes-Barre/Scranton Penguins for their 2009 playoff run.
  He did not, however, appear in any games.

Pierro-Zabotel began the season on the Penguins' ECHL affiliate, the Wheeling Nailers, but was assigned to Wilkes-Barre/Scranton on January 21, 2010.  At the time of his reassignment, he was second in team scoring with 33 points in 38 games.

In February 2011, it was announced that he was loaned to the Cincinnati Cyclones of the ECHL, who are not affiliated with the Penguins. Prior to the start of the 2011-12 ECHL season, the Wheeling Nailers traded Pierro-Zabotel to the Bakersfield Condors for future considerations.

After the 2011-12 season, his entry-level contract with the Pittsburgh Penguins organization expired. Pierro-Zabotel was not re-signed by the Condors and became a free agent on July 1, 2012. On September 27, he signed with the Gwinnett Gladiators of the ECHL.

On July 5, 2013, Pierro-Zabotel signed his first European contract, agreeing to a one-year deal with German second tier club, Lausitzer Füchse of the DEL2. He eventually returned to the Gwinnett Gladiators, where he had spent the majority of his 2012-13 season.

On July 16, 2014, Pierro-Zabotel re-signed with the Gwinnett Gladiators but was traded at the deadline to the Florida Everblades on March 12, 2015. On August 6, 2015, he continued his career in the ECHL, signing a one-year contract with reigning Champions, the Allen Americans. In the 2015–16 season, Pierro-Zabotel quickly transitioned to become an integral contributor to the Americans offence, posting 15 goals and 47 points in 58 regular season games. With 16 post-season points, Pierro-Zabotel helped Allen retain the ECHL Championship.

As a free agent in the off-season, Pierro-Zabotel opted to join his seventh ECHL club, in agreeing to a one-year deal with the Colorado Eagles on August 11, 2016. In his lone season with the Eagles, Pierro-Zabotel claimed his second consecutive Kelly Cup, posting 15 points in 24 playoff appearances.

After a second stint with the Allen Americans, Pierro-Zabotel continued his tenure in the ECHL, agreeing to terms with the Adirondack Thunder on September 3, 2019.

International play

Following his second season in the BCHL, Pierro-Zabotel competed for Canada West at the inaugural 2006 World Junior A Challenge in Yorkton, Saskatchewan.  Playing Canada East in the final, Pierro-Zabotel scored the game-winning goal on the powerplay to win the gold medal by a 4–3 score.  He finished with 9 points in 4 games, second in tournament scoring behind teammate and tournament MVP Kyle Turris.

The next year, Pierro-Zabotel was named team captain for Canada West for the 2007 World Junior A Challenge in Trail, British Columbia.  He led his team past Belarus in a 7–4 quarter-final win with a natural hat trick in the third period, scored in just 4 minutes, en route to a second straight gold medal win against Canada East in the final.  He finished with 7 points in 5 games, tied for second in team scoring behind tournament MVP Mike Connolly.

Records
Vancouver Giants franchise record; most assists, single-season - 79 in 2008–09 (surpassed Darren Lynch - 53 in 2002–03)
Vancouver Giants franchise record; most points, single-season - 115 in 2008–09 (surpassed Gilbert Brule - 87 in 2004–05)

Personal life
Pierro-Zabotel married his long-time girlfriend, Levi Gottfriedson in December 2008, and they have two children together.

Career statistics

Regular season and playoffs

International

Awards and honours

References

External links

Casey Pierro-Zabotel's WHL Profile
Casey Pierro-Zabotel's Profile at Hockey's Future

1988 births
Adirondack Thunder players
Allen Americans players
Bakersfield Condors (1998–2015) players
Canadian ice hockey centres
Charlotte Checkers (2010–) players
Cincinnati Cyclones (ECHL) players
Colorado Eagles players
Florida Everblades players
Gwinnett Gladiators players
Ice hockey people from British Columbia
Living people
Merritt Centennials players
Norfolk Admirals players
Pittsburgh Penguins draft picks
Vancouver Giants players
Wheeling Nailers players
Wilkes-Barre/Scranton Penguins players